India–Lithuania relations are the bilateral relations between India and Lithuania. The Indian embassy in Warsaw, Poland is accredited to Lithuania. Lithuania has an embassy in New Delhi.

Early history
India's first contact with Lithuania was through Lithuanian Christian missionaries who traveled to India in the 16th century. Lithuanian interest in India grew in the 19th century after the similarity between Sanskrit and the Lithuanian language was discovered. Among European languages, Lithuanian is grammatically closest to Sanskrit. Lithuanians regard their language to be the oldest living Indo-European language.

Vydūnas, known as the Mahatma Gandhi and Sri Aurobindo of Lithuania, was interested in Indian philosophy, and created his own philosophical system closely based on the Vedanta. Vydunas stated that Lithuanian spiritual culture, prior to the introduction of Christianity, shared similarities with Hinduism, including the concept  of trimūrti.

Modern history
India recognized Lithuania on 9 September 1991, and established diplomatic relations on 25 February 1992. Jagannath Doddamani served as the first ambassador of India to Lithuania (residing in Poland) from 1992 to 1994. The first ambassador of Lithuania to India was Petras Šimeliūnas who served from 2011 to 2012.

Prime Minister Adolfas Šleževičius visited India in September 1995, and President Valdas Adamkus visited in February 2001.

The Indian embassy in Warsaw, Poland is jointly accredited to Lithuania. Lithuania opened an embassy in New Delhi on 1 July 2008. In 2005, Indian Foreign Minister K. Natwar Singh stated that India would open an embassy in Lithuania. In July 2014, Lithuanian Foreign Minister Linas Antanas Linkevičius urged India to open an embassy in Vilnius. India has not yet opened an embassy in the country, although it opened an honorary consulate in Vilnius on 6 February 2015.

In October 2015, India and Lithuania signed a bilateral agreement on co-operation in agriculture. They also agreed to increase their co-operation in sectors such as food and dairy processing.

Economic relations
Bilateral trade between the two nations totaled US$117.9 million in 2009, $184 million in 2010 and $203 million in 2011. India's major exports to Lithuania are pharmaceuticals, cosmetics, textiles  and consumer goods. Lithuania's main exports to India are machinery  and  mechanical appliances, high tech optical instruments,  base metals and articles of base metal, chemicals, sulphur, lime and cement.

The Indian Baltic Chamber of Commerce (IBCC) was established in Vilnius in 2009. The India-Lithuania Forum was inaugurated in September 2010.

Cultural relations
There is growing interest in Lithuania for Indian dance and music, yoga, ayurveda, and the works of Rabindranath Tagore. Ayurveda centres function in Vilnius and Kaunas. The International Society for Krishna Consciousness (ISKCON) is present in Lithuania, and Sai Baba had over 200 devotees in the country, as of 2012. The Indian Council for Cultural Relations (ICCR) has sponsored several performances by Indian troupes in Lithuania.

Tourism 
As of 2014, around 3,000 Lithuanian citizens visit India annually.

Indian diaspora in Lithuania
As of August 2013, around 300 Indian citizens lived in Lithuania. The majority were students, while the rest were engaged in business activities. Many Indians are employed at the OP Lohia Group's PET plant in Klaipėda. The Indian information technology sector often sends Indian citizens to temporarily work on projects in Lithuania.

External links
 Indian - Baltic Chamber of Commerce official site
 Lithuanian-Indian Forum

References

 
Lithuania
Bilateral relations of Lithuania